The Iskar Gorge is a  gorge passing through the Balkan Mountains (Stara Planina) in Bulgaria. It is the chief pass through the Balkans, which otherwise cross northern Bulgaria in a solid line. The pass connects the capital of Sofia with other major cities in the country, such as Mezdra. There is a road and a railway through the pass, following the course of the Iskar River.

The canyon walls are made of limestone and sandstone, which was carved down by the Iskar over thousands of years, resulting in rugged crags and towers throughout.

External links
 Hiking map of the trails in the Iskar River Gorge region

References

Balkan mountains
Canyons and gorges of Bulgaria
Landforms of Sofia City Province
Landforms of Vratsa Province